Gavilán, meaning sparrowhawk in Spanish, may refer to:

People 
 Antonio Lara de Gavilán (1896–1978), Spanish graphic artist, editorial cartoonist and author of comic
 Diego Gavilán (born 1980), Paraguayan football player
 Giuliana Gavilan (born 1996), Argentine handball player
 Jaime Gavilán (born 1985), Spanish football player
 Kid Gavilán (1926–2003), Cuban former welterweight boxer
 Marcelino Gavilán (1909–1999), Spanish horse rider

Places 
 Galivan, California, United States
 Gavilan Hills, a range in the Temescal Mountains in Riverside County, California
 Gavilán Peak, now called Fremont Peak, in the Gavilan Hills
 Gavilan Peak (disambiguation), a hill near Anthem, Arizona, north of Phoenix
 Gavilan Plateau, in the Temescal Mountains

Other uses 
 Gavilan (TV series), a 1982 TV series
 Gavilan College, a community college located in Gilroy, California
 Gavilán G358, a Colombian light utility transport aircraft of the 1990s
 Gavilan SC, an early laptop computer
 Hydra Technologies Gavilán, an unmanned electrical-surveillance airplane